Giovanni Vincenzi (24 June 1905 – 1970) was an Italian professional footballer who played as a defender.

Honours
Torino
 Divisione Nazionale champion: 1927–28.

External links
 

1905 births
1970 deaths
Italian footballers
Italy international footballers
Serie A players
U.S. Livorno 1915 players
Torino F.C. players
S.S.C. Napoli players
Inter Milan players
Association football defenders